Morea was the name of the Peloponnese peninsula during the Middle Ages.

Morea may also refer to:

Places
 Morea, Illinois, United States
 Morea, Pennsylvania, United States
 Morea (Charlottesville, Virginia), United States, a historic home

People
 Dino Morea (born 1975), Indian model and actor
 Enrique Morea (1924–2017), Argentinian tennis player
 Ipi Morea (born 1975), Papua New Guinean cricketer
 Vani Morea (born 1993), Papua New Guinean cricketer

See also
Moira (disambiguation)
Moria (disambiguation)
Moriah (disambiguation)
Morya (disambiguation)
Mo'orea